Xenocytaea is a genus of spiders in the family Salticidae (jumping
spiders).

Of all 150 salticid genera known from Australia and the entire Pacific, only Chalcotropis, Donoessus and Panysinus resemble Xenocytaea.

Name
The genus name is a combination of Greek ξένος "strange, foreign" and the salticid genus Cytaea. This indicates that despite the similarity of the two genera in male palpal structure, this group of species does not belong in Cytaea.

Species
As of March 2018, the World Spider Catalog lists the following species in the genus:
 Xenocytaea agnarssoni Zhang & Maddison, 2012 – New Guinea
 Xenocytaea albomaculata Zhang & Maddison, 2012 – New Guinea
 Xenocytaea anomala Berry, Beatty & Prószyński, 1998 – Caroline Islands
 Xenocytaea daviesae Berry, Beatty & Prószyński, 1998 – Fiji
 Xenocytaea maddisoni Berry, Beatty & Prószyński, 1998 – Fiji
 Xenocytaea proszynskii Zhang & Maddison, 2012 – New Guinea
 Xenocytaea stanislawi Patoleta, 2011 – Fiji
 Xenocytaea taveuniensis Patoleta, 2011 – Fiji
 Xenocytaea triramosa Berry, Beatty & Prószyński, 1998 – Fiji
 Xenocytaea victoriensis Patoleta, 2011 – Fiji
 Xenocytaea vonavonensis Patoleta, 2011 – Solomon Islands
 Xenocytaea zabkai Berry, Beatty & Prószyński, 1998 – Fiji

References

Salticidae genera
Spiders of Oceania
Salticidae